General elections were held in Guatemala on 11 November 1990. with a second round of the presidential election held on 6 January 1991. The presidential election resulted in a victory for Jorge Antonio Elías of the Solidarity Action Movement, whilst the National Centre Union won the Congressional elections. Voter turnout was 56.4% in the elections on 11 November 1990 and 45.2% in the elections on 6 January 1991.

Results

President

Congress

References

Bibliography
Villagrán Kramer, Francisco. Biografía política de Guatemala: años de guerra y años de paz. FLACSO-Guatemala, 2004.
Political handbook of the world 1990. New York, 1991.

Elections in Guatemala
1990 in Guatemala
1991 in Guatemala
Guatemala
Guatemala
Presidential elections in Guatemala